Rathmalgaha Ela Grama Niladhari Division is a Grama Niladhari Division of the Dambulla Divisional Secretariat of Matale District of Central Province, Sri Lanka. It has Grama Niladhari Division Code E445A.

Rathmalgaha Ela is a surrounded by the Athuparayaya, Dambulla Town, Kalogaha Ela, Thittawelgolla, Kapuwatta, Pahala Wewa, Yakkuragala South and Yapagama Grama Niladhari Divisions.

Demographics

Ethnicity 
The Rathmalgaha Ela Grama Niladhari Division has a Sinhalese majority (97.9%). In comparison, the Dambulla Divisional Secretariat (which contains the Rathmalgaha Ela Grama Niladhari Division) has a Sinhalese majority (95.9%)

Religion 
The Rathmalgaha Ela Grama Niladhari Division has a Buddhist majority (96.8%). In comparison, the Dambulla Divisional Secretariat (which contains the Rathmalgaha Ela Grama Niladhari Division) has a Buddhist majority (94.5%)

References 

Grama Niladhari Divisions of Dambulla Divisional Secretariat
Geography of Matale District